Porterhouse can refer to:
Porterhouse (horse), American Champion race horse
Porterhouse Brewery
Porter House New York, a steakhouse in New York City
Porterhouse steak
Porterhouse, a fictional Cambridge college in the novel Porterhouse Blue by Tom Sharpe